Toy dog traditionally refers to a very small dog or a grouping of small and very small breeds of dog. A toy dog may be of any of various dog types. Types of dogs referred to as toy dogs may include spaniels,  pinschers and terriers that have been bred down in size. Not all toy dogs are lap dogs.

Small dogs 

Dogs found in the Toy Group of breed registries may be of the very ancient lapdog type, or they may be small versions of hunting dogs or working dogs, bred down in size for a particular kind of work or to create a pet of convenient size. In the past, very small dogs not used for hunting were kept as symbols of affluence, as watchdogs, and for the health function of attracting fleas away from their owners.

Breeds 
Most major dog clubs in the English-speaking world have a toy group, under one exact name or another, in which they place breeds of dog that the kennel club categorizes as toy, based on size and tradition. The Kennel Club (UK), the Canadian Kennel Club, the American Kennel Club, the Australian National Kennel Council, and the New Zealand Kennel Club all have a group named "Toy", although they may not all categorise the same breeds in this category.  The United States has a second major kennel club, the United Kennel Club (UKC, originally formed for hunting and working breeds, though general today), and it does not recognize such a group; instead, small dogs are placed with larger dogs of their type, or into a UKC's "Companion Dog" group.  the American Kennel Club began debating whether or not to change the name of their "Toy" group to "Companion", in order to emphasise that dogs are not playthings, but the name change was resisted by traditionalists.

Not including the color and size varieties, breeds categorized by Fédération Cynologique Internationale members as "Companion and Toy" are listed here in alphabetical order. Those with flags are also recognized by the non-member countries indicated by the flag.
 Bichon Frise  
 Bolognese (Bolognese) 
 Boston Terrier 
 Cavalier King Charles Spaniel   
 Chihuahua   	  	
 Chinese Crested Dog   
 Coton de Tuléar
 French Bulldog (Bouledogue français) 
 Griffon Bruxellois (Brussels Griffon)      	  	
 Havanese    	  	
 Japanese Chin (Chin)  
 King Charles Spaniel 	  	  	
 Kromfohrländer   	  	
 Löwchen (Löwchen, Little Lion Dog)	  	  	
 Papillon 
 Petit Brabançon (Small Brabant Griffon)	  	  	
 Phalène (Epagneul nain Continental, Continental Toy Spaniel)	  	
 Lhasa Apso   	  	  	
 Maltese   	
 Mi-Ki  	
 Pekingese   
 Poodle (All three sizes are in the Fédération Cynologique Internationale Companion and Toy group)
 Pug   
 Russkiy Toy 
 Shih Tzu 
 Tibetan Spaniel 	  	  		
 Tibetan Terrier   	

Registries within individual Fédération Cynologique Internationale members, such as the Australian National Kennel Council, may use slightly different nomenclature, depending on the country. Non-member countries use other terminology, but the term toy is only used to group dogs for show purposes.

The Kennel Club (UK) places breeds marked  in the Toy Group. The Canadian Kennel Club recognizes breeds marked  in Group 5, Toys. The American Kennel Club places breeds marked  in the Toy Group. Additional national organizations also recognize the following breeds in their toy groups.

 Affenpinscher     
 Australian Silky Terrier   
 Chihuahua (Long Coat)    
 Chihuahua (Smooth Coat)   
 Chihuahua (Short Coat) 
 English Toy Terrier (Black & Tan)    
 King Charles Spaniel	
 Italian Greyhound     
 Japanese Chin 
 King Charles Spaniel  
 Löwchen    
 Manchester Terrier 
 Mi-Ki 
 Miniature Pinscher     
 Pomeranian     
 Poodle  
 Australian Silky Terrier  
 Toy Fox Terrier 
 Toy Manchester Terrier  
 Yorkshire Terrier     
 Mexican Hairless Dog 

The major national kennel club for each country will have its own list of  breeds that it recognizes as Toy. In addition, some new or newly documented rare breeds may be awaiting approval by a given kennel club. Some new breeds may currently be recognized only by their breed clubs. Some rare new breeds have been given breed names, but may only be available from the breeder or breeders who are developing the breed, and may not yet be recognized by any kennel club.

In addition to the major registries, there are a plethora of sporting clubs, breed clubs, and internet-based breed registries and businesses in which dogs may be registered in whatever way the owner or seller wishes.

See also 
 Pet
 List of dog breeds

References

External links 
 

Dog roles